Fabio Caballero, better known as Caballero (born 1 October 1992), is a Paraguayan professional footballer who last played for 3 de Febrero.

References

External links
 

1992 births
Living people
Paraguayan footballers
Paraguay international footballers
Club Olimpia footballers
Campeonato Brasileiro Série A players
Association football midfielders
Paraguayan expatriate footballers
Expatriate footballers in Brazil